Gyumri railway station, is the oldest railway station in Armenia and the main station of the city of Gyumri.

History
The railway junction of Gyumri is the oldest and the largest one in Armenia. It was formed in 1897. The first railway link to Gyumri that connected the city (then officially called Alexandropol) with Tiflis was completed in 1899. The rail line was then extended from Alexandropol to Yerevan (in 1902), Kars (in 1902), Jolfa (in 1906), and Tabriz. As a result, Alexandropol became an important rail hub. 

The present building of the station, built in 1979, was designed by local architect Rafik Yeghoyan, and in some of its features, particularly in the spatial composition of its entrance hall, echoes medieval Armenian architecture, a tendency sometimes characteristic of soviet Armenian modernist architecture.

As of 2018, the Gyumri railway station operates regular trips to Yerevan, Tbilisi and Batumi. The South Caucasus Railway, is the current operator of the railway sector in Armenia.

References

Railway stations opened in 1897
Buildings and structures in Gyumri
Railway stations in Armenia